My Magic Pet Morphle (also known as Morphle) is a preschool animated series created in 2011 by Dutch animator Arthur van Merwijk. Produced by YouTube channel Morphle TV, which was acquired by Moonbug Entertainment in 2018 and announced in February 2019 that the series premiered on Netflix on January 10, 2019. The show is about a girl named Mila and her magic pet Morphle (who has autism) who can transform his appearance at Mila's will, and teaches themes of friendship, problem-solving and creativity to its preschool audience.

Morphle is hosted on digital platforms including Netflix, Apple TV+, Hulu and Amazon Prime Video. Van Merwijk maintains creative oversight of the show and works with the production team in Amsterdam.

Characters
Mila is a young blonde girl who often wears blue clothing (originally a strapped dress with a long-sleeved shirt underneath but that eventually became an actual dungaree or an overall dress and long-sleeved shirt) or blue bikini, summer hat and a blue hat. She is always seen with her magic pet, Morphle and is the leader in their adventures together. They had an argument in one episode but got along with each other again.
Morphle is the autistic, titular red rabbit-like magic pet who is Mila's pet, friend, and a bit of a sibling at times. His special ability is shape-shifting into anything of wish, which is used for good. His favourite food is ice cream he says if he wants. he also likes chocolate, as well.  He has a high-pitched voice and refers to himself and others in the third-person. Even though he is described as Mila's pet, they are more like siblings/best friends.
Daddy is Mila's unnamed father. He owns the Magic Pet store, which is home to many different creatures, each with their own special ability. He cares a lot about Mila and Morphle.
Troy is a young boy who is one of Mila's friends and is also the younger brother of Firefighter Gerbin, he wears light blue shorts with no shirt for the beach in summer, he also likes dinosaurs. In one episode, Morphle got to cranky and stole his sandcastle. Morphle is his best friend, as well.
Sarah is a young girl who is another friend of Mila, she often has her uncle, Police Officer Freeze. At the beach, she wears a white summer hat and a green bikini like Mila's bathing suit. 
April is another friend of Mila. She plays with Morphle, Mila, and Orphle. When she is at the beach she wears a pink bikini, and in one episode they were having a waterfight (Orphle was her team).
Torphle is a metallic rabbit-like robot magic pet, he has the same shape-shifting abilities as Morphle and Orphle. He is also Enzo's robot and is a friend of Morphle. Torphle made his debut appearance in the episode where Enzo won at the science fair for making him.
Orphle is an antagonist and a rabbit-like magic pet who is Morphle's evil twin. In one episode, he escaped from his world to Morphle's world. He bears a resemblance to the latter except for the fact he is colored green, but however,  he has used it to his advantage,  painting himself red in one episode so that he would trick people into thinking that he is Morphle. He has the same shape-shifting abilities as Torphle and Morphle, but he often uses them for bad. Like Morphle, he refers to himself and others in third person. In one episode, Officer Freeze mistook Morphle for Orphle, until he was reminded that Morphle is red, Orphle is green. Orphle has reformed and has a babysitting job at the magic pet store.
Jorn and Stein are two bumbling brothers who work together as a criminal duo known as the "Chain-Up Office Bandits," with their main hobby causing trouble around the city. They are often at odds with Officer Freeze (as well as the law). They are often arrested for stealing objects and magic pets around town. In one episode, they rename themselves the "Fashion Bandits" and go around the city stealing everyone's clothes, leaving people in their underwear. They are eventually stopped by Mila and Morphle, and are made to return everyone's clothes. It is implied that Jorn and Stein would be European and/or Jewish, since Jorn is a name of Scandinavian origin and is widely used in countries of Scandinavian origin (such as Denmark, Sweden and Norway) and Stein is a name of Germanic origin and is a name quite common in Germany, in addition to being a surname widely used by Jews or descendants of Jews. Stein was replaced by a boy named Winston, implied to be Stein's son.
Telefox is a fox-like baby blue magic pet with light turquoise markings and a maroon nose. As his name states, he has the ability of teleporting himself to anywhere he wishes to go.
Spookler is ghost-like floating magic pet. As his name states, he has the ability to turn anyone into a ghost for one night, if anyone tries to catch him.
Mr. Mayor is Sarah's father, he says "What the?!" whatever someone is stealing from him.
Cuttybun is a small fluffy magical pet that makes anyone cute and follows her around, she spawns hearts that are purple and are capable of creating cuteness.
Police Officer Freeze is a police officer who is often at odds with Jorn and Stein, who is determined (and often fails) to catch them himself. He often says "Not in my city!" whenever he notices someone doing something against the law. He is a bit of a Keystone Kop but toned down for younger audiences.
Zoo Keeper Kenneth is a man who works as a zookeeper, as his name states. He cares about the animals a lot.
Mechanic Joe is an man who, as his name implies, works as a mechanic. It is implied he is Japanese due to the fact he has a Maneki-neko in his workshop, as well as his physical appearance, and the fact that his sign is written in Japanese writing and has Tooly.
Firefighter Gerbin is Troy's older brother who owns Aqually. As his name implies, he is a firefighter who works at the firehouse along with Aqually and a female firefighter named Firefighter Silvia. 
Builder Lawrence is a man who works as a construction worker. He is shown in one episode to have a love interest.
Mr. Vanderboose is an bespectacled elderly man who lives next door to Mila and Morphle. He is often angry and mean towards others, particularly Mila and Morphle, but however he is not entirely an antagonistic character as he is shown to be quite loving towards his dog Barky, who is in contrast to his master, friendly, sweet and lovable.
Wilford is one of Mila's uncles, he is a photographer.
Felipe the Farmer is a boy and a farmer who is a friend of Moprhle and Mila. It is not known if he has another nationality, but he is probably from South America.
Dr. Abraham is a doctor who takes care of magic pets, creatures, and he uses Papa Jungle to grow him a garden and grow a fuzzy fruit tree to cure the sickness call "magic pet flu" to other magic pets.
Enzo is a boy who is a friend of Mila and Morphle. He and Orphle had a race with them. But he use Torphle to help people in the city.
Atmo is a magical pet that can make snow, ice or even change the weather
CandyRay is a magical pet capable of transforming anything into candy, you just have to say the word TRICK OR TREAT and it will automatically transform anything into candy
Animi is a magical pet that can bring absolutely anything to life.
Tooly is a magical pet with the ability to store anything inside his shell, he is shaped like a turtle and his shell is practically infinite
Sporky is a magical pet in the shape of a spoon, capable of cooking anything both quickly and well, his specialty is also being able to create food.
Papa Jungle is a magical pet with magical powers capable of creating jungles, animals can appear both defenseless and dangerous
Aunt Augustine is Mila's aunt and Mila's father's sister
Cubby  is a magical pet in the shape of a teddy bear. light blue color capable of transforming you into an adorable teddy bear with just a hug
Professor Tom is a friend of Professor Rashid and a scientist too. In one episode, she had a car robot that wanted to play soccer.
Playzee It is a pet that has the shape of a Christmas fox with the ability to turn things into toys, it belongs to Santa that Morphle likes a little bit. It can turn back things to normal.
Glitterpug It is a magical cute butterfly or larva shaped pet with a pug with adorable face and can transform anyone into a magic pet.
Geraldo is an Italian-accented man who is often seen serving ice cream to children.
Doubler is a magic pet with multiple eyes with the ability to multiply objects.
Chroma is a yellow magic pet with floppy green ears and three bushy tails, each of a different color. He has the special abilities of changing and absorbing the color of whatever his tail touches. He is also good at jumping really high. He is not antagonistic, but is a bit mischievous.
Jollyphant is a furry pink top hat wearing elephant-like magic pet who has the ability to snort ice cream from his trunk.
Aqually is a green and blue tardigrade-like magic pet with a shrimp-like tail who has the ability of applying water to surfaces.
Professor Rashid is a scientist and an inventor who often invents things. In one episode, it is revealed that he often has trouble thinking ahead. His inventions are meant to help, but can sometimes get turned on him or the public due to accidents or the antics of Jorn and Stein. Some audiences have presumed him to be an Arabian due to his name. He is basically the Absent-minded professor stock character. he will be replaced by professor Paula
Slimy is a magic pet who appears to be a floating blob of green slime with two arms. His special ability involves being able to cover objects, as well as people, with slime, which has a cleansing effect when rinsed.
Tempus is a floating violet and indigo magic pet who appears a bit lizard-like with a stopwatch and no legs. His special ability is being able to stop time.
Mr. Action is a muscular superhero frequently seen as an action figure who is often idolized by Morphle. He was brought to life in one episode, with the help of an invention by Professor Rashid. He unfortunately (and unintentionally) wreaked havoc on the city until Mila and Morphle convinced him to return to being a toy.
Professor Evil is a mad scientist and Mr. Action's nemesis who also appears as an action figure.
Mila Robot and Morphle Robot: These characters are robotic doppelgängers of Mila and Morphle, bearing a resemblance to their organic counterparts, except they have glowing eyes and robotic mouths, and the Morphle robot is not capable of transforming into things. However, in season 2 there is an unpainted metallic Morphle robot 2.0 that is capable of transforming into things. Not much is known about the Mila robot, despite appearing in more episodes than the Morphle robot. Jorn and Stein have used the robots in their plans a few times.
Stringle is a monkey-like magic pet that is light and dark brown that can make colorful things with his magic tail.
Corny is a unicorn-like magical pet who can spawn a rainbow.
Shelly is a little mermaid who swims in the water.
Incra is a cross plant-magic pet that could make things bigger or smaller.
Boba is a bubble-like magic pet who blows bubbles, make anyone speak through his bubble, and jump on top of bubbles.
Freddy the Zookeeper Monkey is a black skinned-monkey who is not very naughty, he always listens to Zoo Keeper Kenneth and watches or bring the monkeys back to their home.
Nully has the power to take away any magic pet's powers for ten seconds.
Gravt is a magical pet that is shaped like a ball, he has the power to change gravity to all the things he zaps. In one episode, he was about to save Mila, but Morphle saved her with him when he morphed in to a rocket.

History 
In 2011 van Merwijk, an animation school graduate, created a YouTube channel for preschoolers based on nursery rhymes. Throughout the first year van Merwijk produced every episode himself. His sister, who is a professional singer, created the music for the show. Van Merwijk drew the characters and his friend, Daan Velsink, created the rig-animation. After saving his profits during the program's first year, he used the money to set up a studio in Amsterdam. He hired animators and artists and created additional videos per month.

My Magic Pet Morphle was originally titled Mila and Her Magic Pet, and the YouTube channel uploaded its first video on 19 December 2011, and it was a Christmas special video (the first non-Christmas video was released on 14 January 2012). At the time, Morphle has a tail on his back until it was removed sometime, no later than its debut in early 2015.

The show functioned this way until 2015 when it took on its current TV-show format. According to van Merwijk, Morphle is one of the first preschool channels on YouTube that treated its videos as episodes of a traditional television program. When van Merwijk made this change, viewership grew substantially. By 2016 the show had millions of views each month.

In November 2018 Moonbug Entertainment purchased Morphle TV from van Merwijk. At the time of the purchase the show had about five million subscribers and 3.7 billion views.

In February 2021 Moonbug partnered with Poetic Brands to create branded children's apparel based on My Magic Pet Morphle.

Premise
The show revolves around a young girl named Mila, who is best friends with Morphle, a red magic pet with rabbit-like ears who is able to transform or 'morph' into anything. They often help others around town or help to stop the bad guys, learning lessons about problem-solving, colors, shapes and friendship.

Episodes

This episode list reflects original upload date on the official YouTube channel Morphle TV.

References

External links
 Official website

 My Magic Pet Morphle YouTube Channel

Moonbug Entertainment
Dutch animated television series
Animated preschool education television series
Animated television series about children